Dayton Allen (born Dayton Allen Bolke; September 24, 1919 – November 11, 2004) was an American comedian and voice actor. He was one of the "men in the street" on The Steve Allen Show. His catchphrase was "Why not, Bubbe?" (pronounced "whooooyyy not!")

Early life 
Allen was born in New York City, the son of Helen and Sol Bolke, a dress manufacturer. His younger brother, Bradley Bolke, had some limited success as a voice actor, often appearing in supporting roles alongside Allen. He grew up in Mount Vernon, New York, where he graduated from A.B. Davis High School in June 1936. One of his school friends was Art Carney.

Career 
Allen, like Carney, began his career in radio. In 1937–1938 WINS (AM) hired him as a disc jockey.

He was the voice of various New York-based children's television show characters, appearing on Winky Dink and You as Mr. Bungle for five years, and playing "Phineas T. Bluster", "Flub-a-Dub", and various other puppet characters on Howdy Doody (as well as several "live" characters, including Ugly Sam and Pierre the Chef) for 4 years. Dayton was also the voice of Deputy Dawg, Heckle and Jeckle, Luno, and many early 1960s Terrytoons cartoon characters. Allen also provided the voice of Lancelot Link, Secret Chimp. He continued to be a voiceover performer through the 1990s.

He was best known as the "Why Not?" man when he joined the cast of the NBC Sunday night variety show that Allen began hosting to compete against Ed Sullivan on CBS. The catchphrase began as a stalling ad-lib to an interview question; then it caught on. Allen used it for television commercials and saw novelty toys, a book, and a record spin-off from the "Why not?" phenomenon. In its day, fans were shouting "Why not?" as often as Mad Magazine'''s famous "What? Me Worry?"

His brother, Bradley Bolke, was also a voice actor best known as the voice of Chumley (Tennessee Tuxedo's walrus sidekick) on Tennessee Tuxedo and His Tales, and the syndicated version of The Underdog Show.

Allen's talents as a mimic were showcased in October 1963 when he appeared alongside Groucho Marx on the CBS-TV game show I've Got A Secret. The show’s panelists had been blindfolded, and all their questions to Groucho were answered instead by Allen doing an accurate Groucho impersonation. Finally, with panelists Bess Myerson, Betsy Palmer, Henry Morgan, and Bill Cullen all stumped, the secret was revealed.

A classic example of Allen's humor comes from an August 1968 appearance on The Steve Allen Show'', syndicated nationally in the US by Filmways: "Did you know your mind alone can make you smart?"

After his show business career ended, Allen was a real estate agent, operating out of an office in Dobbs Ferry, New York.

He died of complications from a stroke.

References

External links
 
 Dayton Allen profile, archive.org
 Dayton Allen remembered m newsfromme.com

1919 births
2004 deaths
20th-century American male actors
American male comedians
American male voice actors
American male radio actors
Male actors from New York City
Comedians from New York City
People from Dobbs Ferry, New York
Businesspeople from New York City
20th-century American comedians
Terrytoons people
20th-century American businesspeople